Winona station, formerly known as the Chicago. Milwaukee & St. Paul Railway Station, is a historic train station in Winona, Minnesota, United States. It is served by Amtrak's daily Empire Builder service. It was originally built in 1888 by the Chicago, Milwaukee, St. Paul and Pacific Railroad, known later as the Milwaukee Road.  A former Milwaukee Road freight house also exists here.

The station was designed by architect John T. W. Jennings. It was listed on the National Register of Historic Places in 2013 as the Chicago, Milwaukee & St. Paul Railway Station for having local significance in the theme of transportation.  It was nominated for representing the development of train transportation in Minnesota with Winona as a major rail hub.

Other stations for Winona

Winona also had a Chicago and North Western Railroad depot that was located at 2nd and Huff. It was a two story brick station, "mildly Queen Anne in style"  Originally built in the late 1880s for the Winona and St. Peter Railroad at the loop where the Winona Rail Bridge crossed the Mississippi river, it was torn down in 1980. The demolition of this depot building was a motivation for the Winona Heritage Association to partner with the Milwaukee Road to restore the remaining station.
After the Milwaukee Road went into its final bankruptcy, it had deferred maintenance on the Winona station, which made it likely that building also would be demolished.

The original Chicago, Burlington and Quincy Empire Builder stopped at the Winona Junction station. It was on the east side of the Mississippi river in Buffalo, Buffalo County, Wisconsin on what is now the BNSF Northern Transcon line.  Because this station was located across the Main Channel Bridge from downtown Winona, connecting "Burlington Bus" service was provided. East Winona was another station location on the same track further southeast.

See also
 National Register of Historic Places listings in Winona County, Minnesota

References

External links

Winona Amtrak Station (USA Rail Guide -- Train Web)

Amtrak stations in Minnesota
Buildings and structures in Winona, Minnesota
National Register of Historic Places in Winona County, Minnesota
Railway stations on the National Register of Historic Places in Minnesota
Railway stations in the United States opened in 1888
Former Chicago, Milwaukee, St. Paul and Pacific Railroad stations
Transportation in Winona County, Minnesota